Lumde is a village and Village Development Committee  in Ilam District in the Province No. 1 of eastern Nepal. At the time of the 1991 Nepal census it had a population of 2,473 persons living in 449 individual households.

Other meanings of the word
Lumbi or, Lombi, is also a stream in Bandundu Province of the Democratic Republic of the Congo. Lumbo is also a very common last name used in the Congo and Angola and has many spelling variations; Pierre Lumbi was a Zaire Minister of Foreign Affairs.original name: Lumbi,Lombi
geographical location: Bandundu, Democratic Republic of the Congo, Africa
geographical coordinates: 4° 58' 0" South, 18° 0' 0" East
Lumbi:  This place is situated in Bandundu, Democratic Republic of the Congo, its geographical coordinates are 4° 58' 0" South, 18° 0' 0" East and its original name (with diacritics) is Lumbi.Lumbi in Democratic Republic of the Congo.The name Lumbi,originates in the democratic republic of the Congo and is a very common name there.The president of the democratic republic is Mr.Lumbi.The name has its origins dating thousands of years back to Africa has spelling variations

References

External links
UN map of the municipalities of Ilam District

Populated places in Ilam District